WSFJ-TV (channel 51) is a television station licensed to London, Ohio, United States, broadcasting the digital multicast network Bounce TV to the Columbus area. Owned and operated by the Ion Media subsidiary of the E. W. Scripps Company, the station maintains studios on North Central Drive in Lewis Center, Ohio.

Even though WSFJ-TV is licensed as a full-power station, its broadcasting radius only covers the immediate Columbus area, as it shares spectrum with low-power, Class A Daystar station WCLL-CD, which transmits from a tower on Twin Rivers Drive near downtown Columbus. Therefore, WSFJ-TV must rely on cable and satellite carriage to reach the entire market.

History
WSFJ-TV began operations on March 9, 1980. Originally licensed to Newark, another Columbus suburb, it was the first independent television station in Columbus, and the first new commercial station in the area since 1949. On paper, Columbus had grown large enough to support an independent station as far back as the late 1960s. However, the Columbus area is a very large market geographically, stretching across a large swath of central Ohio. The only available full-power allocations in the market were on UHF, and UHF stations do not carry well across large blocks of territory. By the late 1970s, cable television had gained enough penetration to make an independent station viable. Prior to the arrival of WSFJ, Columbus-area cable systems imported the signals of independents from nearby areas, such as WXIX-TV in Cincinnati, WUAB in Cleveland and WTTV in Indianapolis.

The new station ran only Christian programs, including The PTL Club, Jimmy Swaggart, The 700 Club, Another Life, and children's programming. In the fall of 1980, WSFJ began running secular programming such as Independent Network News and New Zoo Revue during the weekdays, along with Wild Kingdom and other hunting and wildlife shows on Saturdays. However, the schedule remained predominantly Christian, and its policy regarding secular programming was very conservative so as not to offend the sensibilities of its mostly fundamentalist and Pentecostal viewership. It was the only over-the-air source of non-network programming in central Ohio until WTTE (channel 28) signed on in 1984.

In February 1999, the station affiliated with Pax TV (later i: Independent Television, now Ion Television), running the network's programming from 11 a.m. to 7 p.m. and again from 10 p.m. to 1 a.m. WSFJ also began to be seen on a translator in Columbus, WCPX-LP (channel 48), which was owned by Pax's parent company, Paxson Communications (now Ion Media). Before this, Pax programming was seen overnights on WWHO, a WB affiliate then owned by the Paramount Stations Group. WSFJ was the largest Ion affiliate owned by a company other than Ion Media Networks. While WSFJ was affiliated with Pax, WCMH-TV (channel 4), the local NBC owned-and-operated station, reaired their NewsChannel 4 newscasts on channel 51, as part of an agreement with NBC and Pax.

WSFJ was sold to Guardian Enterprise Group in 2004. In 2005, WSFJ began to acquire some family-friendly programming separate from its affiliation with Pax/i and rebranded the station as GTN51—short for "Guardian Television Network." Guardian Enterprise Group was located in the same office as WSFJ. Other companies under the Guardian Enterprise Group include Guardian Studios and Guardian Human Resources.

In March 2007, WSFJ moved its master control and studio into a facility at Easton Town Center, which generated the content that was sent to their new digital transmission facility in Pataskala, off of SR 161. That year, WSFJ launched its digital signal on channel 24.

Ion sold WCPX-LP in 2007, and in January 2008 it was relaunched as an Azteca América affiliate. At the same time, Ion programming disappeared from WSFJ, leaving it exclusively with family entertainment, religious shows, and paid programming. Ion's main program feed would later resurface in the market on the third subchannel of WCMH-TV.

In July 2008, it was announced that Guardian would sell WSFJ to the Trinity Broadcasting Network for $16 million. Guardian retained its other properties, including the then-upcoming .2 Network, and acquired W23BZ, which had been a low-power repeater of TBN; it picked up WSFJ's programming when channel 51 began carrying TBN programming on October 1, 2008. However, by selling off its full-powered station and getting a low-powered signal, GTN would find themselves at a disadvantage—being on a low-power signal, it lost its must-carry status; as a result, Guardian urged viewers to contact their cable systems to pick up GTN after the move to channel 23.

As a TBN-owned station, WSFJ served as a pass-through for the TBN national feed with virtually no local programming. TBN has long been known for buying existing stations in order to get must-carry status on local cable systems. In 2011, the station began work on a new television studio in Lewis Center, Ohio in Delaware County.

TBN entered into an option agreement with Ion Media Networks on November 14, 2017, which gave Ion the option to acquire the licenses of WSFJ-TV and three other TBN stations serving Ohio and Indiana–WDLI-TV in Canton, WKOI-TV in the Dayton area, and WCLJ-TV in Indianapolis–all of whom had sold their spectrum in the Federal Communications Commission (FCC)'s incentive auction; Ion exercised the option on May 24, 2018. The sale was completed on September 25, 2018 and the next day, all TBN programming was dropped for Ion Life (later Ion Plus), which had not been carried in the Columbus market previously. Ion Media has pursued a new strategy since 2018 of giving Ion Life a primary channel placement (mainly involving purchases and shuffles related to the incentive auction) in order to require local cable and satellite providers to offer the channel under must-carry provisions. Ion Television is already available in the Columbus market on cable and satellite via its national feed; WCMH-DT3's Ion feed is not carried on any local pay TV providers.

After E. W. Scripps Company ceased operations of Ion Plus, WSFJ changed its affiliation to Bounce TV.

Technical information

Subchannels
The station's digital signal is multiplexed:

For some time after TBN took over the station, WSFJ did not multiplex its signal, unlike the other TBN-owned stations. However, in July 2012, WSFJ upgraded its studios and equipment, and carried the TBN affiliated subchannels seen on all other full power TBN stations until September 2018.

Analog-to-digital conversion
WSFJ-TV shut down its analog signal, over UHF channel 51, on April 16, 2009, the date TBN-owned full-power stations permanently ceased analog transmissions. The station's digital signal remained on its pre-transition UHF channel 24, using PSIP to display WSFJ-TV's virtual channel as channel 51 on digital television receivers.

References

External links

Bounce TV affiliates
Scripps News affiliates
E. W. Scripps Company television stations
SFJ-TV
Television channels and stations established in 1980
1980 establishments in Ohio
London, Ohio